Elaine Tan (born 28 June 1979) is an English actress. As a child, she spent several years at the Sylvia Young Theatre School, appearing in television, film, commercials, radio, and stage productions, including Royal Variety Shows, South Pacific and the Sadler's Wells Theatre production of The King and I. She graduated from the University of Exeter with a degree in law and completed the Legal Practice Certificate in London.

Tan was cast in the lead role of Liat by Sir Trevor Nunn in his production of South Pacific at the Royal National Theatre, and sang the song "Happy Talk" as a duet with the character of Bloody Mary, which features on the musical soundtrack recorded at Abbey Road Studios.

In 2006, she was nominated for Best Actress at the ECU European Independent Film Festival.

Her television credits include Nighty Night, Auf Wiedersehen, Pet, EastEnders, 'Til Death, Boston Legal, Entourage, CSI:Crime Scene Investigation, and Hawaii Five-0. She played Kelli Lin in Person of Interest, was Anne in Hand of God for Amazon, and 'Angeline Borgen' in the hit Norwegian crime drama Frikjent (Acquitted).

Tan played Lucy Chang in the HBO feature film Starter for 10, Sala Khan in the film Jewtopia, April in Gina Prince-Bythewood's Beyond the Lights, Xandra in Paul Thomas Anderson's Inherent Vice, and Elyse in Tully.

She has appeared in commercials for Olay, Mercedes, Coors Light, Camaro Chevrolet, Clairol, and Gillette.

Filmography

Film

Television

References

External links
 

Alumni of the Sylvia Young Theatre School
Alumni of the University of Exeter
English soap opera actresses
Actresses from London
Living people
British stage actresses
British film actresses
20th-century British actresses
21st-century British actresses
British people of Chinese descent
1979 births